Pretty Black Dots is the first solo studio album by the British guitarist Gary Marx.

Track listing

Personnel 

Gary Marx - Vocals, all instruments
Choque Hosein - Drum programming

External links
 Official Gary Marx page

2002 debut albums